Ampanihy is a town and commune in Madagascar. It belongs to the district of Mahabo, which is a part of Menabe Region. The population of the commune was estimated to be approximately 7,000 in 2001 commune census.

Only primary schooling is available. It is also a site of industrial-scale  mining. The majority 89% of the population of the commune are farmers, while an additional 10% receives their livelihood from raising livestock. The most important crop is rice, while other important products are cassava and sweet potatoes.  Industry and services provide both employment for 0.5% of the population.

References and notes 

Populated places in Menabe